Clivina occulta is a species of ground beetle in the subfamily Scaritinae. It was described by Sloane in 1896.

References

occulta
Beetles described in 1896